Kari Kola or Kari Kala may refer to:
 Kari Kola, Babol (كريكلا - Karī Kolā)
 Kari Kola, Babolsar (كاريكلا - Kārī Kolā)
 Kari Kola, Savadkuh (كريكلا - Karī Kolā)
 Kari Kola, Shirgah, Savadkuh County (كاريكلا - Kārī Kolā)